Gregory VI may refer to:

Pope Gregory VI, John Gratian, elected 1045; abdicated at the Council of Sutri in 1046; died 1048
Antipope Gregory VI, first to claim to be pope as successor to Sergius IV
Gregory VI of Cilicia aka Gregory VI Apirat or Grigor VI Apirat, catholicos of the Armenian Church
Ecumenical Patriarch Gregory VI of Constantinople (1798–1881), Georgios Fourtouniadis, reigned 1835–1840 and 1867–1871